Ronald Kuba (born 14 October 1994) is a Slovak racing cyclist. In June 2021, he won the Slovak National Time Trial Championships. In September 2021, he rode in the men's time trial event at the 2021 UCI Road World Championships.

Major results
2019
 6th Time trial, National Road Championships
2020
 3rd Time trial, National Road Championships
2021
 1st  Time trial, National Road Championships

References

External links

1994 births
Living people
Slovak male cyclists
Place of birth missing (living people)